Ephraim Rhodes (16 August 1882 – 30 September 1960) was an English professional footballer and manager who played in the Football League for Sunderland in the early 20th century. He also played for and managed Brentford in the Southern League and was posthumously inducted into the club's Hall of Fame in May 2015.

Playing career

Sunderland 
Born in South Bank, North Yorkshire, Rhodes began his career in his hometown at Northern League club South Bank. He moved to divisional rivals Grangetown Athletic in 1901 and finished runners-up in the Northern League during the 1901–02 season. Rhodes' performances earned him a move to reigning Football League First Division champions Sunderland in May 1902. He made only five appearances during the 1902–03 season, but slowly forced his way into the team during the 1903–04 season, making 16 appearances. Rhodes was a regular during the 1904–05 season, making 28 appearances and scoring a penalty to register his first goal for the club. He made 24 appearances and scored another penalty during the 1905–06 season. Rhodes was a virtual ever-present during the 1906–07 season, making 39 appearances and scoring two goals. 1907–08 would be Rhodes' final season with Sunderland, in which he made only eight appearances, but he scored his only goal for the club from open play. He made 120 appearances and scored five goals in a six-season spell with the Rokerites.

Brentford 
Rhodes moved to London to join Southern League First Division club Brentford in July 1908. Under manager Fred Halliday, he won the Southern Professional Charity Cup during his debut season, the first silverware of his career. Including wartime matches, Rhodes made almost 400 appearances for the Griffin Park club. He re-registered as a player for the first post-war season of competitive football in September 1919, but did not make an appearance and subsequently retired as a player.

Coaching and managerial career
Rhodes became player-manager of Brentford in November 1912, following the departure of Fred Halliday. His tenure got off to a bad start, with relegation to the Southern League Second Division at the end of the 1912–13 season. He relinquished his duties at the end of the 1914–15 season. He managed the Bees in 87 games, winning 38, drawing 19 and losing 30. Rhodes returned to Brentford as trainer in 1922 and served until 1925.

Personal life 
Rhodes married Daisy Caroline Shinner in 1904 and they had three children. He served in the Royal Army Pay Corps (Royal Fusiliers) during the First World War. Rhodes' younger brother Ernie was also a footballer and the pair played together at Grangetown Athletic and Sunderland. Following his time at Brentford, Rhodes became a supporter of the club.

Career statistics

Managerial statistics

Honours 
Brentford
 Southern Professional Charity Cup: 1908–09
 London Combination: 1918–19

Individual

 Brentford Hall of Fame

References

1882 births
English footballers
Sunderland A.F.C. players
1960 deaths
Military personnel from Yorkshire
South Bank F.C. players
Brentford F.C. players
Brentford F.C. managers
English Football League players
Southern Football League players
Northern Football League players
Royal Army Pay Corps soldiers
People from South Bank, Redcar and Cleveland
Association football fullbacks
Footballers from Yorkshire
English football managers
Royal Fusiliers soldiers
British Army personnel of World War I